The final of the second season of the Copa Paulino Alcantara will be contested by Ceres–Negros and Kaya F.C.–Iloilo on 16 November 2019 on neutral ground at the Biñan Football Stadium in Biñan.

Background
Kaya F.C.–Iloilo are the defending champions of the Copa Paulino Alcantara having won the inaugural tournament in 2018 while Ceres–Negros are the league champions for the 2019 season. Both teams topped their groups in the group stage and advances to the semifinals. This marks the first time Ceres-Negros advances to the knockout stages after failing to do so in the previous tournament. Ceres-Negros overcame Stallion Laguna 4–3 away from home at the Biñan Football Stadium while Kaya–Iloilo won 3–0 over Mendiola at the Aboitiz Pitch in Lipa, Batangas to secure a berth in the final. Kaya–Iloilo also secured the second slot for Philippine clubs at the 2020 AFC Cup since their final opponents already clinched the first by winning the league title.

The final will be held 16 November 2019 on neutral ground at the Biñan Football Stadium in Biñan, Laguna. Ceres–Negros enters the final with a 28-match undefeated streak when league matches also taken into account.

Route to the final

Match summary

The 2019 Copa Paulino Alcantara final was contested in the Biñan Football Stadium in Biñan, Laguna. At the time of the final, Ceres-Negros were considered the underdogs as majority of their first-team players (Carli de Murga, Mike Ott, Sean Kane, Jose Elmer Porteria and Stephan Schröck) were on international duty for the Philippine national team in the 2022 Fifa World Cup qualifiers, trimming the squad size down to 14. Kaya–Iloilo, on the other hand, had a full-strength squad and were also the defending champions, having won the 2018 Copa Paulino Alcantara, and were looking for revenge after Ceres beat them 3–0 on the last matchday of the 2019 Philippines Football League season.

The match was an even affair with both sides having equal possession of the ball until Senegalese forward Robert Lopez Mendy struck off a deflection from Louie Casas. Kaya then had majority of possession, with Jovin Bedic, Jordan Mintah, and Kenshiro Daniels coming close to finding the back of the net. The half ended 1–0 in favor of Ceres. In the 2nd half, Kaya retained much of the possession but a slick pass from Mendy found Negros-born Tristan Robles, who finished in the 68th minute. Kaya's Copa top scorer Kenshiro Daniels found the back of the net in the 85th minute to reduce the scoreline to 2–1. Kaya pushed for an equalizer but could not find the back of the net.

The match ended in a 2–1 in favor of Ceres-Negros. By doing so, they completed the first-ever "Invincibles" domestic season in the Philippine Professional Football era. However, since they already qualified for the 2020 AFC Cup by winning the 2019 Philippines Football League, Kaya-Iloilo qualified as they were runners-up in both competitions. Stallion Laguna by being 3rd place in the 2019 Philippines Football League season qualify as a standby team should Ceres get through to the 2020 AFC Champions League group stage.

Ceres Negros also clinched all three individual awards of the tournament: Robert Mendy won the Golden Boot by scoring five goals in the whole tournament, Roland Muller was awarded the Golden Glove, and Takashi Odawara the Golden Ball award.

References

Final 2019
Copa Paulino Alcantara Final